The Australian Society of Soil Science Incorporated (ASSSI) was founded in 1955 to "advance soil science in the professional, academic, and technical fields". The Society consists of a federation of branches operating the 'umbrella' of the ASSSI Federal Council.

Branches
Current branches are: New South Wales, Queensland, Riverina, South Australia, Victoria, Tasmania and Western Australia. The Society currently has approximately 800 members. All financial Ordinary members of ASSSI automatically become members of the International Union of Soil Sciences.

The ASSSI offers members an opportunity to gain accreditation under the Certified Professional Soil Scientist (CPSS) Scheme.

Conferences
Every second year, the ASSSI Federal Council organises a national soils conference in conjunction with the branch hosting the conference. The 2010 ASSSI conference was held in conjunction with the 19th World Congress of Soil Science (WCSS) in Brisbane, Queensland, Australia.

References

External links
Australian Society of Soil Science Incorporated
IUSS Official Website

Soil and crop science organizations
Scientific organisations based in Australia
1955 establishments in Australia
Scientific organizations established in 1955
Agricultural organisations based in Australia